John Ryan (23 February 1893 – 6 January 1963) was an Irish long-distance runner. He competed in the men's 10,000 metres at the 1924 Summer Olympics.

References

External links
 

1893 births
1963 deaths
Athletes (track and field) at the 1924 Summer Olympics
Irish male long-distance runners
Olympic athletes of Ireland
Place of birth missing
Olympic cross country runners